The Planned French Invasion of Britain, 1708, also known as the 'Entreprise d’Écosse', took place during the War of the Spanish Succession. The French planned to land 5,000–6,000 soldiers in northeast Scotland to support a rising by local Jacobites that would restore James Francis Edward Stuart to the throne of Great Britain. 

Despite French commander Claude de Forbin warning the chances of evading the Royal Navy long enough to land his troops were extremely limited, his fleet of small privateers reached Scotland in March 1708. As he had forecast, he was unable to disembark the troops and returned home, narrowly escaping a pursuing British naval force.

Such attempts reflected a fundamental and continuing divergence of objectives: While the Stuarts wanted to regain their throne, for the French, they were a simple and low-cost way to absorb British resources. Much of the Royal Navy was occupied chasing de Forbin, and troops were diverted from Ireland and Southern England. That made it successful for France, but a failure for the Jacobites.

Background
Under the 1697 Treaty of Ryswick, Louis XIV recognised William III as legitimate monarch of England and Scotland. In July 1701, the War of the Spanish Succession began and when the exiled James II died on 16 September, Louis reneged on that commitment and proclaimed James's son James Francis Edward Stuart as king. William himself died in March 1702 and was succeeded by James's Protestant daughter Anne.

By late 1707, the war had reached a stalemate. Despite victories in Flanders, the Allies had been unable to break French border defences or to place their candidate on the Spanish throne. Both sides attempted to use internal conflicts to break the deadlock. Britain supported the camisard rebels in south-western France, and the Jacobites served a similar function for the French.

The Jacobite agent Nathaniel Hooke convinced Louis that there was an opportunity for a Scottish rising, that would divert British troops from Europe. The 1707 Union was widely unpopular in Scotland, and French privateers caused enormous losses for the British maritime trade and the coastal fishing industry. One reason was the Royal Navy faced multiple demands to escort merchant convoys and did not view protecting Scottish shipping as a priority.

Hooke visited Scotland in 1707 and met supporters like the Earl of Erroll, and the elderly Jacobite Thomas Buchan provided reports on bases at Fort William and Inverness. Senior nobles such as the dukes of Atholl and Hamilton refused to commit, partly because of an attempt in 1703 by Simon Fraser, later Lord Lovat, to implicate them in a Jacobite plot as part of a personal feud. However, Hooke obtained a letter of support signed by Erroll, the Earl of Panmure and six others, promising 25,000 men and requesting 8,000 French troops, weapons, money, artillery, ammunition and "majors, lieutenants, and serjeants to discipline" the Scots army.

The Jacobite agent John Ker also claimed support from Presbyterian dissidents or Cameronians who "are persuaded (Union) will bring an infinite number of calamities..., and render the Scots slaves to the English". The radicals viewed union as a threat to the independence of the Church of Scotland, despite legal safeguards for its independence. Although the Cameronians certainly considered that option, Ker was in reality a British double agent whose role was to persuade them not to do so. By November 1707, Louis decided that there was enough potential support and planning began supervised by Pontchartrain, who had been involved with attempts in 1692 and 1696. Claude de Forbin was appointed commander of the naval squadron, and the Comte de Gacé was in charge of the landing force.

Expedition
As the Royal Navy patrolled exits from the French Channel ports, naval operations often took place during the winter months, when wind and tides made it harder to enforce a blockade. However, it also increased risks from the weather; conditions off north-eastern Scotland were well known to French privateers and de Forbin's biggest concern was lack of a confirmed landing place. He later recorded "the Minister did not mention any port in a condition to receive us,... or where our fleet might anchor and... troops disembark in safety".

Based on information supplied by French captains, de Forbin told that Pontchartrain and Louis XIV the expedition had no chance of success, but planning continued. The fleet assembled at Dunkirk, a major privateer base for centuries since ships could reach the Thames in a single tide, allowing them to reach as far north as the Orkney Islands. By the end of February, 5,000–6,000 troops were ready to embark, joined by James himself on 9 March.

Rather than slow-moving transports, de Forbin insisted on using a larger number of small but fast privateers, with reduced crews and fewer guns to accommodate the troops. While that improved their chances of avoiding the Royal Navy, they could not hope to win in a naval battle. The British had been monitoring the preparations, and a squadron under Sir George Byng now arrived off the nearby port of Gravelines, preventing the French from departing. As James was ill with measles, the troops were disembarked while he recovered, and after a week Byng was forced to return to England for resupply. As soon as he left, James and the soldiers were re-loaded, and on 17 March, 30 privateers and five warships left Dunkirk.

Their departure was immediately delayed by a two-day gale but forced Byng to take shelter, enabling the French to make for the Firth of Forth. Rather than following the coastline, de Forbin kept out to sea to avoid being spotted and ended up north of the proposed landing site. On 25 March, the French anchored near Fife Ness and spent the next day searching for a landing place, allowing Byng to catch up with them. Despite James' protests, the French privateers could not face the British in battle and headed north. They then spent two days attempting to enter the Moray Firth before They gave up. Most of them made it back to Dunkirk although they were pursued by the British around the north of Scotland and west of Ireland, but they sustained severe damage to both ships and men.

Hearing news of the French fleet, some of the Jacobite gentry, including James Stirling of Keir House and four others, gathered at Brig o' Turk. They were arrested, imprisoned in Newgate Prison in London and later transferred to Edinburgh Castle, where they were tried for high treason. They were acquitted of that charge, as the evidence against them proved only that they had drunk to James' health.

Aftermath
 
Perceptions of the expedition's value reflect a fundamental divergence of objectives between France and their Jacobite allies. The Stuarts wanted to regain their throne; for the French, they were a useful low-cost means of absorbing British resources, but a Stuart restoration would not change the threat posed by British expansion.

The 1708 attempt was a response to the dire military situation France faced as a result of Marlborough's victories in Flanders. It occupied large elements of the British and Dutch navies for several months, with Byng ordered to remain in Scotland even after its defeat, and troops were diverted from Ireland and southern England. A French army of 110,000 recaptured large parts of the Spanish Netherlands before defeat at Oudenarde on 11 July evicted it once more. 

Despite its ultimate defeat, the expedition achieved France's short-term purpose but helped the pro-war Whigs win a majority in the May 1708 general election, the first held after Union. It also damaged the Jacobites, who had failed to launch an effective insurgency in Scotland despite popular opposition to Union. In his overview of the political situation, Hooke concluded that "the country seemed to be fully resolved on peace".

References

Sources
 
 
 
 
 
 
 
 
 
 
 
 
 
 
 
 

Cancelled military operations involving France
Battles of the War of the Spanish Succession
1708 in Great Britain
1708 in France
Cancelled invasions
Invasions of the United Kingdom
Britain 1708